is a passenger railway station located in the city of Fussa, Tokyo, Japan, operated by East Japan Railway Company (JR East).  Higashi means east in Japanese, and Higashi-Fussa Station is located east of central Fussa.

Lines

Station layout

The station is normally unstaffed, and consists of an island platform serving two tracks, forming a passing loop on the single-track line.

Platforms

History
The station opened on 10 December 1931. With the privatization of Japanese National Railways (JNR) on 1 April 1987, the station came under the control of JR East.  The southern section of the Hachikō Line between Hachiōji and Komagawa was electrified on 16 March 1996, with through services commencing between Hachiōji and Kawagoe.

Passenger statistics
In fiscal 2010, the station was used by an average of 1,422 passengers daily (boarding passengers only).

Surrounding area
 Yokota Air Base

See also
 List of railway stations in Japan

References

External links

 JR East Station information 

Railway stations in Japan opened in 1931
Railway stations in Tokyo
Stations of East Japan Railway Company
Hachikō Line
Fussa, Tokyo